Antonio Gustavo Menéndez Remon (born February 20, 1965 in Havana, Cuba) is a retired Major League Baseball pitcher. He played during two seasons at the major league level for the Cincinnati Reds, Pittsburgh Pirates, and San Francisco Giants. He was drafted by the Chicago White Sox in the 1st round (20th pick) of the 1984 amateur draft.

Sources

1965 births
Living people
Cincinnati Reds players
Pittsburgh Pirates players
San Francisco Giants players
Major League Baseball pitchers
Major League Baseball players from Cuba
Cuban expatriate baseball players in the United States
Gulf Coast White Sox players
Buffalo Bisons (minor league) players
Appleton Foxes players
Peninsula White Sox players
Birmingham Barons players
Oklahoma City 89ers players
Vancouver Canadians players
Tulsa Drillers players
Nashville Sounds players
Phoenix Firebirds players
Diablos Rojos del México players
Cuban expatriate baseball players in Mexico
Cuban expatriate baseball players in Canada
American Senior High School (Miami-Dade County, Florida) alumni